Christian Albicker (5 January 1892 – 22 September 1934) was a Swiss footballer who played for FC Basel. He played mainly in the position as midfielder, but also as a striker. 

Between the years 1907 and 1920, Albicker played a total of 126 games for Basel scoring a total of 58 goals.

Albicker played for the Swiss national football team on five occasions. His first game was on 9 March 1913 against France on 9 March 1913 in Geneva as Switzerland lost 1–4. In his fourth international game, also against France in Stade de Paris in Saint-Ouen, Seine-Saint-Denis, he scored the last minute equaliser in the 2–2 draw. His last international game was on 31 January 1915 in Turin in the 1–3 defeat against Italy.

Sources and References
 Rotblau: Jahrbuch Saison 2017/2018. Publisher: FC Basel Marketing AG. 

FC Basel players
Swiss men's footballers
Switzerland international footballers
Association football forwards
Association football midfielders
1892 births
1934 deaths